Burns Flat is a town in Washita County, Oklahoma, United States. The population was 2,057 at the 2010 census.

History

Airport

Immediately west of Burns Flat is Clinton-Sherman Industrial Airpark which is a licensed spaceport.  The facility hosts the third longest civilian runway in North America, stretching approximately 2.5 miles in length.

Geography
Burns Flat is located at  (35.356042, -99.176008).

Demographics

2010
As of the census of 2010, there were 2,057 people, 720 households, and 533 families residing in the town. The racial makeup of the town was 82.5% White, 2.3% African American, 3.5% Native American, 0.4% Asian, 0% Pacific Islander, 4.2% from other races, and 7% from two or more races. Hispanic or Latino of any race were 11.8% of the population.

There were 720 households, out of which 45.4% had children under the age of 18 living with them, 49.3% were married couples living together, 17.5% had a female householder with no husband present, and 26% were non-families. 20.4% of all households were made up of individuals, and 6.3% had someone living alone who was 65 years of age or older.

2000
As of the census of 2000, there were 1,782 people, 622 households, and 480 families residing in the town. The racial makeup of the town was 88.55% White, 1.35% African American, 3.93% Native American, 6.8% Asian, 0.17% Pacific Islander, 2.81% from other races, and 2.30% from two or more races. Hispanic or Latino of any race were 6.00% of the population.

There were 622 households, out of which 46.3% had children under the age of 18 living with them, 61.1% were married couples living together, 13.7% had a female householder with no husband present, and 22.8% were non-families. 20.1% of all households were made up of individuals, and 7.9% had someone living alone who was 65 years of age or older. The average household size was 2.86 and the average family size was 3.32.

In the town, the population was spread out, with 34.3% under the age of 18, 9.3% from 18 to 24, 28.6% from 25 to 44, 19.7% from 45 to 64, and 8.1% who were 65 years of age or older. The median age was 30 years. For every 100 females, there were 90.8 males. For every 100 females age 18 and over, there were 86.6 males.

The median income for a household in the town was $32,353, and the median income for a family was $35,870. Males had a median income of $30,278 versus $17,625 for females.  The per capita income for the town was $14,350. 15.6% of the population and 14.1% of families were below the poverty line.  Out of the total people living in poverty, 22.4% were under the age of 18 and 13.9% were 65 or older.

Economy
Burns Flat has a variety of businesses and industry including Washita State Bank and Bird Equipment.  Retail and dining options include Keith's Butcher Shop, Dollar General, Rudy's Superette and Cafe, Gret's, L&S Burns Flat Hardware and The Station - Mini-mall.

Education
Burns Flat hosts the Burns Flat-Dill City School District with K-12 education.  Technical training and educational programs are offered at Western Technology Center's main campus in Burns Flat.

Climate

References

External links
 Town of Burns Flat
 Encyclopedia of Oklahoma History and Culture - Burns Flat

Towns in Oklahoma
Towns in Washita County, Oklahoma